Proto-writing consists of visible marks communicating limited information. Such systems emerged from earlier traditions of symbol systems in the early Neolithic, as early as the 7th millennium BC in Eastern Europe and China. They used ideographic or early mnemonic symbols or both to represent a limited number of concepts, in contrast to true writing systems, which record the language of the writer.

Paleolithic 
Analysis in 2022, led by Bennet Bacon, an amateur archaeologist, showed that lines and dots on Upper Palaeolithic cave paintings were used to indicate the mating cycle of animals in a lunar calendar, the markings found in over 400 caves across Europe were compared to the mating cycles of the animals with which they were associated, showing a correlation with the month of the year in which the animals depicted in the cave paintings would typically give birth. The markings were 20,000 years old predating any other equivalent writing systems by 10,000 years.

Neolithic

Neolithic China

In 2003, tortoise shells were found in 24 Neolithic graves excavated at Jiahu, Henan province, northern China, with radiocarbon dates from the 7th millennium BC. According to some archaeologists, the symbols carved on the shells had similarities to the late 2nd millennium BC oracle bone script. Others have dismissed this claim as insufficiently substantiated, claiming that simple geometric designs such as those found on the Jiahu shells cannot be linked to early writing.

Neolithic Europe

The Dispilio tablet is a wooden tablet bearing inscribed markings, unearthed during George Hourmouziadis's excavations of Dispilio in Greece, and carbon 14-dated to 5202 (± 123) BC.  It was discovered in 1993 in a Neolithic  lakeshore settlement that occupied an artificial island near the modern village of Dispilio on Lake Kastoria in Kastoria, Western Macedonia, Greece.

The Vinča symbols (6th to 5th millennia BC, present-day Serbia) are an evolution of simple symbols beginning in the 7th millennium BC, gradually increasing in complexity throughout the 6th millennium and culminating in the Tărtăria tablets of c. 5300 BC.

Chalcolithic and Early Bronze Age
The transition from proto-writing to the earliest fully developed writing systems took place in the late 4th to early 3rd millennia BC in the Fertile Crescent.

Prehistoric Mesopotamia

The Kish tablet, dated to 3500 BC, reflects the stage of Proto-Cuneiform, when what would become the cuneiform script of Sumer was still in the proto-writing stage. By the end of the 4th millennium BC, this symbol system had evolved into a method of keeping accounts, using a round-shaped stylus impressed into soft clay at different angles for recording numbers on clay tablets and accounting tokens. This was gradually augmented with pictographic writing using a sharp stylus to indicate what was being counted. The transitional stage to a writing system proper takes place in the Jemdet Nasr period (31st to 30th centuries BC).

Prehistoric Egypt

A similar development took place in the genesis of the Egyptian hieroglyphs. Various scholars believe that Egyptian hieroglyphs "came into existence a little after Sumerian script, and ... probably [were] ... invented under the influence of the latter ...", although it is pointed out and held that "the evidence for such direct influence remains flimsy" and that "a very credible argument can also be made for the independent development of writing in Egypt ..."

Bronze Age
During the Bronze Age, the cultures of the Ancient Near East are known to have had fully developed writing systems, while the marginal territories affected by the Bronze Age, such as Europe, India and China, remained in the stage of proto-writing.

The Chinese script emerged from proto-writing in the Chinese Bronze Age, during about the 14th to 11th centuries BC (Oracle bone script), while symbol systems native to Europe and India are extinct and replaced by descendants of the Semitic abjad during the Iron Age.

Indian Bronze Age

The Indus script is a symbol system that emerged during the end of the 4th millennium BC in the Indus Valley Civilisation.

European Bronze Age
With the exception of the Aegean and mainland Greece (Linear A, Linear B, Cretan hieroglyphs), the early writing systems of the Near East did not reach Bronze Age Europe. The earliest writing systems of Europe arise in the Iron Age, derived from the Phoenician alphabet.

However, there are number of interpretations regarding symbols found on artefacts of the European Bronze Age which amount to interpreting them as an indigenous tradition of proto-writing. Of special interest in this context are the Central European Bronze Age cultures derived from the Beaker culture in the second half of the 2nd millennium BC. Interpretations of the markings of the bronze sickles associated with the Urnfield culture, especially the large number of so-called "knob-sickles" discovered in the Frankleben hoard, are discussed by Sommerfeld (1994).  Sommerfeld favours an interpretation of these symbols as numerals associated with a lunar calendar.

Later proto-writing
Even after the Bronze Age, several cultures have gone through a period of using systems of proto-writing as an intermediate stage before the adoption of writing proper. The "Slavic runes" (7th/8th century) mentioned by a few medieval authors may have been such a system. The quipu of the Incas (15th century), sometimes called "talking knots", may have been of a similar nature. Another example is the system of pictographs invented by Uyaquk before the development of the Yugtun syllabary (c. 1900).

African Iron Age

Nsibidi is a system of symbols indigenous to what is now southeastern Nigeria. While there remains no commonly accepted exact date of origin, most researchers agree that use of the earliest symbols date back between the 5th and 15th centuries. There are thousands of Nsibidi symbols which were used on anything from calabashes to tattoos and to wall designs. Nsibidi is used for the Ekoid and Igboid languages, and the Aro people are known to write Nsibidi messages on the bodies of their messengers.

See also

References

 
History of writing
Neolithic